Centro de Comercio Internacional is an office skyscraper located in Bogotá, Colombia. The building is  190m/623 ft, 50 floors. The building is another neighbor of the second largest skyscraper in Colombia, Torre Colpatria. Located inside this building are some of the offices of Davivienda Bank which recently obtained the rights of the building. When it was built, it was called Centro Las Americas.

Architecture 
Its address is 28th Street # 13A - 15, it has 17 elevators, the service areas and the emergency stairs. The exterior of the building is defined by glass paneling and both lateral sides by only one vertical line of windows. The tower has a huge open space in front of its entrance. The tower is in use, and is the third tallest building in Bogotá. When it was finished in 1977 it was the tallest building in Latin America, and it continued to be so until the construction of the Colpatria Tower.

See also
List of tallest buildings in South America
List of tallest buildings in Colombia

References

External links

 Skyscraper.com Colombia diagram
 Skyscrapers.com

Landmarks in Colombia
Skyscraper office buildings in Colombia
Tourist attractions in Bogotá
Buildings and structures in Bogotá
Office buildings completed in 1977